WMHZ (1340 AM) is a radio station licensed to serve the community of Holt, Alabama. The station is owned by TTI, Inc and airs a classic rock format.

The station was assigned the WMHZ call letters by the Federal Communications Commission on March 5, 2012.

Translators
WMHZ is rebroadcast on the FM broadcast band via two translators: W267CZ and W292DU.

References

External links
Official Website

MHZ (AM)
Radio stations established in 2013
2013 establishments in Alabama
Classic rock radio stations in the United States
Tuscaloosa County, Alabama